Imbolo Mbue (born 1981) is a Cameroonian-American novelist and short-story writer based in New York City. She is known for her debut novel Behold the Dreamers (2016), which has garnered her the PEN/Faulkner Award for Fiction and the Blue Metropolis Words to Change Award. Her works draw from her own experiences as an immigrant, as well as the experiences of other immigrants.

Early life and education 
Mbue was born in 1981 in Limbe, Cameroon, in the English speaking region of the country, where she was raised until the family sponsored her higher education studies in the United States.

After completing her undergraduate and graduate studies, she began a job in marketing for a media company, which she lost during the recession. During this period of time, Mbue observed the difference in classes while walking through New York City, where she observed cab drivers who were predominantly black, waiting to drive executives. This formed the basis of her novel Behold the Dreamers (2016).

Mbue's writing, particularly Behold the Dreamers, seeks to explore topics regarding the complexity of American immigration policies and achievements, and overall, the pursuance of the American Dream. According to Mbue, the novel connects the characters' experiences and feelings with those of her own: financial struggles, hopelessness, reevaluation of one's goals, and struggles as an immigrant. She has stressed the importance of literature providing empathy, which she feels is lacked in immigration policies and overall politics. Her 2020 novel How Beautiful We Were takes on the environmental crisis in Africa, caused by corporate greed.

Mbue became an American citizen in 2014, and currently lives in New York City with her husband and children.

Career and Behold the Dreamers
Mbue came to the United States in 1998 to study business management as an undergraduate student at Rutgers University. After graduating in 2002, she went on to complete her M.A. from Columbia University, in 2006. She began to work in the corporate sector in New York City, but lost her job as did millions of Americans during the Great Recession.

In 2014, she signed a million-dollar deal with Random House for her debut book Behold the Dreamers, which was published in 2016. The novel garnered critical acclaim for, according to NPR, the way it "depicts a country both blessed and doomed, on top of the world, but always at risk of losing its balance. It is, in other words, quintessentially American."

According to the Washington Posts Ron Charles, as the book's release coincided with the 2016 presidential election, paired with the  "anti-immigrant" rhetoric that was brought to light by candidates and their supporters, the novel brought to light the "vast bureaucracy designed to wall off the American Dream from outsiders". In 2017, the novel was selected by Oprah Winfrey for her book club.

Mbue is a contributor to the anthology New Daughters of Africa (edited by Margaret Busby, 2019).

Bibliography

Novels

 Behold the Dreamers, 2016, 
 Voici venir les rêveurs (French translation), 2016, 
 Das geträumte Land (German translation), 2017, 
How Beautiful We Were, 2021, 
Puissions-nous vivre longtemps, (French translation Catherine Gilbert), Éditions Belfond, 2021

Short fiction 

Stories

See also 
 Nsah Mala
 John Nkemngong Nkengasong

References

External links 

 Official website
 "Oprah Talks to Behold the Dreamers Author Imbolo Mbue", Oprah.com, 26 June 2017.
 "Imbolo Mbue Interview: Everybody Has a Story". Video interview by Marc-Christoph Wagner, New York, October 2016.
  Jane Ciabattari, "Imbolo Mbue on the Post-Colonial Greed of the Oil Industry", Literary Hub, 16 March 2021.

1981 births
Living people
21st-century American essayists
21st-century American novelists
21st-century American women writers
American women essayists
American women novelists
Cameroonian emigrants to the United States
Cameroonian women novelists
The New Yorker people
PEN/Faulkner Award for Fiction winners
People from Southwest Region (Cameroon)